, also known as the , is a Japanese mystery novel series written by Nisio Isin and illustrated by Kinako. Kodansha released twelve volumes from October 2015 to May 2021 under their Kodansha Taiga label. A manga adaptation with art by Suzuka Oda was serialized from 2016 to 2019. It was collected in five tankōbon volumes. Both the novel series and the manga are licensed in North America by Vertical. An anime television series adaptation by Shaft aired from April 11 to June 27, 2021 on ABC and TV Asahi's ANiMAZiNG!!! programming block.

Characters

The main protagonist of the series. Year 2, class B at Yubiwa Academy Middle School. She becomes the student council president in Dizaka no Bishōnen.
She became involved with the Pretty Boy Detective Club in a case involving a star that she had been searching for ten years. Following the resolution of the case, she has been dressing up as a man and visiting the club. She has become a regular member since The Pretty Boy in the Attic. She has excessively-good eyesight and usually wears glasses to suppress it. She is also known as "Mayumi the Seer."
She also appears in Mazemonogatari, a collaborative novel with the Monogatari series. Under the direction of Manabu, she visits the North White Snake Shrine to observe the heavens.

5th grade, class A at Yubiwa Academy Elementary School. His nickname is Kogoro (fifth grader → Kogo). The leader of the Pretty Boy Detective Club. Also known as "Manabu the Aesthete." Mayumi calls him "the leader."
He claims to be uneducated and acts cheerfully and arrogantly without reading the atmosphere but always seeks beauty and will not do anything that goes against aesthetics. Although he often does nothing but gives orders, he is recognized as a leader by the group.

Year 3, class A at Yubiwa Academy Middle School. Former student council president. Vice leader of the Pretty Boy Detective Club. Also known as "Nagahiro the Orator." After Michiru pointed out to Mayumi in Oshie to Tabisuru Bishōnen that she was calling him "Sakiguchi-senpai," she started calling him "Senpai-kun."
He has a fiancée who is in the first grade of elementary school, so he has been ridiculed as a lolicon, but he denies it. He says, "I'm not a lolicon. It's just that my fiancée, whom my parents decided on their own, happens to be six years old." He has been the president of the student council for three consecutive years since his speech as the representative of the new students when he entered the school. He has a beautiful voice, which he admits to himself and others, and is good at not only making speeches but also copying vocal cords. He is the liaison officer for the Detective Boys. He is a soft-spoken honor student.

Year 2, class A at Yubiwa Academy Middle School. Also known as "Michiru the Epicure." Mayumi calls him "delinquent."
He is a dangerous person who tops the "ranking of students who should never be involved in the school." He is known as "the bossman" outside of school, but he is also a good cook and has a family-oriented side. He has a habit of using a lot of satirical metaphors.

Year 1, class A at Yubiwa Academy Middle School. Ace of the track and field team. Also known as "Hyota the Adonis." Mayumi calls him "Mr. Bare-Legs."
He wears a uniform that has been changed to look like shorts. Ever since he entered the school wearing such a uniform, all the girls who saw it stopped shortening their skirts and started wearing black stockings. He has a well-developed face and is ridiculed for being like the archangel who bosses other angels.
He insists on exposing his legs even in winter. He is a member of the detective squad's physical strength and mobility section. Despite his cute appearance, he often acts carelessly and makes dangerous comments. Has been kidnapped three times in the past. His parents are divorced.

Year 1, class A at Yubiwa Academy Middle School. Also known as "Sosaku the Artiste." Mayumi calls him "Child Genius."
He is the heir to the Yubiwa Foundation, the parent organization of the Yubiwa Academy. He is the de facto president of the Yubiwa Foundation. A child prodigy with both financial and artistic talents. He is a member of the Detective Boys' art team. He is expressionless and of few words, but only Manabu can read his thoughts. Usually only speaks twice in each book.

The leader of the "Twenties," a group of illegal couriers. Also known as the "Twenty Faces of Beauty."
She is not a good person, but she is a beautiful woman who loves her friends.

A second-year student at Hairdressing Middle School. Student council president. Charismatic and ambitious.
He runs a casino called "Reasonable Doubt." He is involved with a private weapons company and reports on their products.
He also appears in Mazemonogatari, a collaborative novel with the Monogatari series.

Media

Novels
The novels are written by Nisio Isin and are illustrated by Kinako. During the development of the story in the Bōkyaku Tantei series, the "Pretty Boy Detective Club" was a group originally intended to appear there, but Nisio Isin decided it could be published as an independent story. Kodansha has published eleven volumes from October 2015 to December 2019 under their Kodansha Taiga imprint. In an interview for the Japanese magazine "Da Vinci," Nisio stated his plans for 2021 and said that he wanted to develop a new story in the series because of the anime adaptation. On March 13, 2021 the new volume titled The Pretty Boy in the Rue Morgue was announced. It was released on May 14, 2021. The novels are licensed in North America by Vertical, which has published three volumes of the series. The English editions were translated by Winifred Bird.

Manga
A manga adaptation with art by Suzuka Oda, began serialization in Kodansha's shōjo manga magazine Aria in April 2016, and it moved to Kodansha's shōnen manga magazine Shōnen Magazine Edge in October 2018 after Aria ceased publication in April 2018, and continued the publication until July 17, 2019. It was collected in five tankōbon volumes.
The manga is licensed in North America by Vertical. The English release is in omnibus 2-in-1 volumes.

Anime
An anime adaptation was announced on the tenth volume of the novel on November 22, 2019. The television series is under the chief direction of Akiyuki Shinbo, direction of Hajime Ootani, animated by Shaft, produced by Aniplex, featuring character designs adapted for animation by Hiroki Yamamura (Shaft), and music composed by Masatomo Ota and EFFY. Shinbo and Shaft are serving as series script supervisors, and Yukito Kizawa is writing the scripts themselves. Kenjirou Okada is the assistant director; and Yamamura, Akihisa Takano (Shaft), and Sayuri Sakimoto are the chief animation directors. Tsutomu Shibuya (Shaft), Nagisa Sekiguchi (Shaft), and Ryou Komori are the main animators. The series aired from April 11 to June 27, 2021 on ABC and TV Asahi's ANiMAZiNG!!! programming block. Sumika performed the series' opening theme song "Shake & Shake," while the series' cast Ayumu Murase, Taito Ban, Toshiki Masuda, Shōgo Yano, and Gen Satō performed the ending theme song "Beautiful Reasoning." Aniplex of America licensed the series and streamed it on Funimation.

Reception
The School Library Journal listed the first volume of Pretty Boy Detective Club as one of the top 10 manga of 2021.

Notes

References

External links
  
  
 
 

2015 Japanese novels
2021 anime television series debuts
Anime and manga based on novels
Aniplex
Asahi Broadcasting Corporation original programming
Book series introduced in 2015
Japanese mystery novels
Kodansha books
Kodansha manga
Mystery anime and manga
Shaft (company)
Shōjo manga
Shōnen manga
Vertical (publisher) titles
Nisio Isin